The De Croo Government is the incumbent Federal Government of Belgium, led by Prime Minister Alexander De Croo since 1 October 2020.

History 
The creation of the De Croo Government occurred on 1 October 2020, 494 days after the 2019 Belgian federal election of May 2019 as the 2019–20 Belgian government formation had been again a difficult process. The government replaced the minority Wilmès II Government, which was a temporary government instated to handle the consequences of the coronavirus outbreak. The De Croo Government is a so-called Vivaldi coalition, named after composer Antonio Vivaldi due to his work The Four Seasons which corresponds to the four different political views present in this coalition: the liberals (Open Vld and MR), the socialists (Vooruit and PS), the greens (Groen and Ecolo) and the Christian democrats of CD&V.

Most notably this government doesn't have a majority in the Flemish language group, as the two largest political parties in Flanders (and simultaneously in all of Belgium) are part of the opposition: N-VA and Vlaams Belang. Other opposition parties are the Francophone parties Les Engagés (known as cdH until March 2022) and DéFI and the nationwide PVDA-PTB.

Composition 
The Constitution requires an equal number of Dutch- and French-speaking ministers (regardless of the Prime Minister) and with all parties requiring some positions, the number of members in the Government has increased considerably, from 12 to 14 ministers with an additional 5 extra Secretaries of State for a total of 7 extra members in the Government compared to the previous Wilmès II Government.

With several new parties coming in to the government and many existing parties replacing their ministers, only three ministers remain which were already present in the Wilmès II Government: Prime Minister Alexander De Croo (who was Minister of Development Cooperation, Finance and fighting Fiscal Fraud), the previous Prime Minister Sophie Wilmès who now becomes Minister of Foreign Affairs and David Clarinval who moves from Minister of Budget, Civil Service, National Lottery and Scientific Policy to Minister of the Middle Class, SMEs, Self-employed, Agriculture, and Institutional Affairs. A large number of government members were relatively unknown at the time of their appointment, as several parties decided to opt for new faces instead of familiar ones. One notable returnee is Frank Vandenbroucke who, after a nine-year break from politics, returns to become Minister of Health and Social Affairs, and has held multiple positions in the period 1994–2009, including Ministers of Foreign Affairs, Social Affairs, Labor, and Pensions.

References 

2020 establishments in Belgium
Belgian governments
Cabinets established in 2020
Current governments